The Dersim rebellion was a Zaza-Kurdish uprising against the central government in the Dersim region of eastern Turkey, which includes parts of Tunceli Province, Elazığ Province, and Bingöl Province. The rebellion was led by Seyid Riza, a chieftain of the Abasan tribe. As a result of the Turkish Armed Forces campaign in 1937 and 1938 against the rebellion and the subsequent Dersim massacre  (sometimes called the Dersim genocide) of civilians, thousands of Zazas died and many others were internally displaced.

On 23 November 2011, Turkish prime minister Recep Tayyip Erdoğan gave an apology for the Dersim massacre, describing it as "one of the most tragic events of our near history" adding that, whilst some sought to justify it as a legitimate response to events on the ground, it was in reality "an operation which was planned step by step". However, this is viewed with suspicion by some, "who see it as an opportunistic move against the main opposition party, the secular CHP."

Background

Ottoman period
Kurdish tribes, which were feudal (manorial) communities led by chieftains (agha) during the Ottoman period, enjoyed a certain degree of freedom within the boundaries of the manors owned by the aghas. Local authority in these small manorial communities was in the hands of feudal lords, tribal chieftains and other dignitaries, who owned the land and ruled over the serfs who lived and worked on their estates. However, the general political authority in the provinces, such as Dersim, was in the hands of the Ottoman government.

Early republican era
Following the establishment of the Republic of Turkey in 1923, some Kurdish tribes became unhappy about certain aspects of Atatürk's "Kemalist policies", described as "the ideology of the new political élite tied to the single-party régime", imposing a policy of Turkification, including the removal of functionaries of "Kurdish race" in Turkish Kurdistan and land reform, and staged armed revolts that were put down by the Turkish military.

Dersim had been a particularly difficult province for the Ottoman government to control, with 11 different armed rebellions between 1876 and 1923. The rebellious stance of the aghas in Dersim continued during the early years of the Republic of Turkey. Aghas in Dersim objected to losing authority in their manorial affairs and refused to pay taxes; and complaints from the provincial governors in Dersim were sent to the central government in Ankara, which favoured land reform and direct control over the country's farmlands, as well as state planning for agricultural production. In an Interior Ministry report in 1926, it was considered necessary to use force against the aghas of Dersim. On November 1, 1936, during a speech in parliament, Atatürk described Dersim as Turkey's most important interior problem.

Resettlement Law
The Turkification process began with the 1934 Turkish Resettlement Law. Its measures included the forced relocation of people within Turkey, with the aim of promoting cultural homogeneity. In 1935, the Tunceli Law was passed to apply the Resettlement Law to the newly-named region of Tunceli, previously known as Dersim and populated by Kurdish Alevis. This area had a reputation for being rebellious, having been the scene of eleven separate periods of armed conflict over the previous 40 years.

"Tunceli" law
The Dersim region included the Tunceli Province whose name was changed from Dersim to Tunceli with the "Law on Administration of the Tunceli Province" (Tunceli Vilayetinin İdaresi Hakkında Kanun), no. 2884 of 25 December 1935 on January 4, 1936.

Fourth General Inspectorate
In order to consolidate its authority in the process of Turkification of religious and ethnic minorities, the Turkish Grand National Assembly passed Law No. 1164 on 25 June 1927 which allowed the state to establish Inspectorates-General. Following the First Inspectorate-General (1 January 1928, Diyarbakır Province),  the Second Inspectorate-General (19 February 1934, Edirne Province) and the Third Inspectorate-General (25 August 1935, Erzurum Province), the Fourth Inspectorate-General (Dördüncü Umumi Müfettişlik) was established in January 1936, in the traditional Dersim region, which includes Tunceli Province, Elazığ Province and Bingöl Province. The Fourth Inspectorate-General was governed by a "Governor Commander" within a military authority. He was given wide-ranging authority in juridical, military and civilian matters. He also had the power to resettle or exile people who lived in the region. The quell the rebellion, the Turkish Interior Minister Sükrü Kaya ordered that boys and girls of the Dersim region were to be educated in boarding schools outside of the Dersim region. In those schools, they were to be Turkified and following their graduation, married off to each other. Women were to be Turkified at an earlier stage than men as women lacked contact with the outside world and if not Turkified, were unable to pass the Turkishness on to their children. In September 1937, the Elazig Girls' Institute in which the aim was to raise Turkish women out of Kurdish girls was established in Elazıg. 

On 1 November 1936, during a speech in the Grand National Assembly of Turkey, Atatürk described the situation in Dersim as Turkey's most important internal problem.

The rebellion 

After the "Tunceli" Law, the Turkish military built observation posts in certain districts. Following public meetings in January 1937, a letter of protest against the law was written to be sent to the local governor. According to Kurdish sources, the emissaries of the letter were arrested and executed. In May, a group of local people ambushed a police convoy in response.

Meeting at Halbori cells
Seyid Riza, the chieftain of Yukarı Abbas Uşağı, sent his followers to the Haydaran, Demenan, Yusufan, and Kureyşan tribes to make an alliance.

According to Turkish authorities, on March 20–21, 1937, at 23:00 hrs, the Demenan and Haydaran tribes broke a bridge connecting Pah and Kahmut in the Harçik Valley. The Inspector General gave the order to prepare for action to the 2nd Mobile Gendarmerie Battalion at Pülümür, the 3rd Mobile Gendarmerie Battalion at Pülür, the 9th Gendarmier Battalion at Mazkirt, and the Mobile Gendarmerie Regiment at Hozat, and sent one infantry company of the 9th Mobile Gendarmier Battalion to Pah.

Turkish military operations 

Around 25,000 troops were deployed to quell the rebellion. This task was substantially completed by the summer and the leaders of the rebellion, including tribal leader Seyid Riza, were hanged. However, remnants of the rebel forces continued to resist and the number of troops in the region was doubled. The area was also bombed from the air. The rebels continued to resist until they ran out of ammunition, in late 1938, by which time the region was devastated.

According to Osman Pamukoğlu, a general in Turkish Army in the 1990s, Atatürk had given the operational order himself.

1937

First Dersim Operation
On September 10–12, 1937, Seyid Riza came to the government building of the Erzincan Province for peace talks and was arrested. On the next day, he was transferred to the headquarters of the General Inspectorate at Elazığ and hanged with 6 (or 10) of his fellows on November 15–18, 1937 Ihsan Sabri Çağlayangil, who would later become foreign minister, arranged the trials and hanging of the leaders of the rebellion and some of their sons. 

They were:
Seyit Rıza
Resik Hüseyin (Seyit Rıza's son, 16 years old)
Seyit Hüseyin (the chieftain of Kureyşan-Seyhan tribe)
Fındık Aga (Yusfanlı Kamer Aga's son)
Hasan Aga (of the Demenan tribe, Cebrail Ağa's son)
Hasan (a Kureyşan tribesman Ulkiye's son)
Ali Aga (Mirza Ali's son)

On November 17, 1937, Mustafa Kemal Atatürk came to Pertek to take part in the opening ceremony for the Singeç Bridge. In his journey to Elazığ the same month, he was accompanied by the Minister of the Interior Şükrü Kaya and Sabiha Gökçen.

1938

Second Dersim Operation 
The prime minister, Celal Bayar (in office: October 25, 1937 – January 25, 1939) had agreed to an attack on the Dersim rebels. The operation started on January 2, 1938 and finished on August 7, 1938.

Third Dersim Operation 

The Third Tunceli Operation was carried out between August 10–17, 1938.

Sweep operations
Sweep operations that started on September 6, were continued for 17 days.

Aerial operations
Turkish planes flew numerous sorties against the rebels during the rebellion. Among the pilots was Kemal Atatürk's adopted daughter, Sabiha Gökçen, the first female fighter pilot. A report of the General Staff mentioned the "serious damage" that had been caused by her 50 kg bomb, upon a group of fleeing bandits.

Muhsin Batur, engaged in operations for about two months over Dersim, stated in his memoirs that he wanted to avoid talking about this part of his life.  Kurdish leader Nuri Dersimi claimed that the Turkish air force bombed the district with poisonous gas in 1938.

Massacres
According to an official report of the Fourth General Inspectorate, 13,160 civilians were killed by the Turkish Army and 11,818 people were taken into exile, depopulating the province. According to a claim by Nuri Dersimi, many tribesmen were shot dead after surrendering, and women and children were locked into haysheds which were then set on fire. According to McDowall, 40,000 people were killed. Christian Gerlach reports that 30,000 Kurds were massacred by the Turkish Army after the rebellion.

Hüseyin Aygün, a jurist author, wrote in his book Dersim 1938 and Obligatory Settlement: "The rebellion was clearly caused by provocation. It caused the most violent tortures that were ever seen in a rebellion in the Republican years. Those who didn't take part in the rebellion, and the families of the rebels, were also tortured."

Numbers killed
The contemporary British estimate of the number of deaths was 40,000, although this number could be exaggerated. It has been suggested that the total number of deaths may be 7,594, over 10,000, or over 13,000.

Deportations 
Around 3,000 people were forcibly deported from Dersim. On the 4th of May 1938 a Turkish Cabinet decision resolved that Turkish military forces which had previously been massed in the area would attack Nazimiye, Keçigezek Sin and Karaoglan. "This time all the people in the area will be collected and deported out of the area and this collection operation will attack the villages without warning and collect the people. To do this, we will collect the people as well as the arms they have. At the moment, we are ready to deport 2,000 people." In the same decision ordering to respond to any resistance by rendering those "incapable of movement on the spot and until the end", İsmail Beşikçi concludes this meant to kill them, along with orders to destroy their homes and deporting those remaining.

Ethnocide
The policy of population resettlement under the 1934 Law on Resettlement was a key component of the Turkification process that began to be implemented first with the Armenian genocide in 1915 as Turkey transitioned from a pluralistic, multi-ethnic society to a "unidimensional Turkish nation-state". İsmail Beşikçi has argued that the Turkish government actions in Dersim were genocide. Martin van Bruinessen has argued that the actions of the government were not genocide, under international law, because they were not aimed at the extermination of a people, but at resettlement and suppression. Van Bruinessen has instead talked of an ethnocide directed against the local language and identity. According to Van Bruinessen, the 1934 law created "the legal framework for a policy of ethnocide." Dersim was one of the first territories where this policy was applied.

In March 2011, a Turkish court ruled that the actions of the Turkish government in Dersim could not be considered genocide according to the law because they were not directed systematically against an ethnic group.

Aftermath

Early Turkish interpretation 
Turkish state's reaction to the uprising was publicly justified as "disciplining and punishment" (tedip ve tenkil). It contributed to a Kemalist perception of Dersim and its populace, which characterises the province as unruly and defends violent state intervention. This narrative is encountered in Naşit Hakkı Uluğ's book The Feudal Lord and Dersim (Derebeyi ve Dersim), which depicts Dersim as a security threat to the Turkish Republic. It was not until 2009 that the massacre was publicly acknowledged, and in recent years, oral history has been used as a method to study anti-civilian violence excluded from the official history of the event.

Turkish government apology 
On November 23, 2011, Prime Minister Recep Tayyip Erdogan apologized "on behalf of the state" over the killing of over 13,000 people during the rebellion. His remarks were widely commented on both inside and outside Turkey. His comments were pointedly directed at opposition leader Kemal Kılıçdaroğlu (who in fact is from Tunceli). Erdogan reminded his audience that Kılıçdaroğlu's party, the CHP, had been in power at the time of the massacre, then the only political party in Turkey. He described the massacre as "one of the most tragic events of our near history" saying that, whilst some sought to justify it as a legitimate response to events on the ground, it was in reality "an operation which was planned step by step".

See also 
Ararat rebellion
Koçgiri rebellion
Sheikh Said rebellion
Kurdish Alevism

References

Further reading
 
Boztas, Özgür Inan. "Did a Genocide Take Place in the Dersim Region of Turkey in 1938?." Strassler Center for Holocaust and Genocide Studies (2015): 1-20.

Sources

External links

Dersim Massacre, 1937-1938, Hans-Lukas Kieser

 
Conflicts in 1937
Conflicts in 1938
1937 in Turkey
1938 in Turkey
1937 protests
1938 protests
Rebellions in Turkey
Kurdish–Turkish conflict
Kurdish people
Kurdistan
Massacres of Kurds
Alevism
Alevis
Yarsanism
Ethnic cleansing in Asia
Mass murder in 1938 
Mass murder in 1937 
Massacres in 1937 
Massacres in 1938 
20th-century mass murder in Turkey
1937 murders in Turkey
1938 murders in Turkey